Kyaw Zin Htet (born 2 March 1990) is a Burmese professional footballer who plays as a goalkeeper for Yangon United F.C. and the Myanmar national football team.

International career
In 2007, he played for Myanmar at the 2007 SEA Games, where they reached the final. He was the youngest goalkeeper to play at the SEA Games, aged just 17.

Personal life
On 13 February 2021, shortly after the outbreak of nationwide protests against the military junta, he announced his support for the people and criticised the military coup. Then , Retired from Professional football life. 

He is not related to Kyaw Zin Phyo or Kyaw Zin Lwin.

International

Honour
SEA Games:
 Southeast Asian Games Silver medalist (2007)

References 

1987 births
Living people
Burmese footballers
Myanmar international footballers
Kanbawza F.C. players
Zwegabin United F.C. players
Yangon United F.C. players
Association football goalkeepers
Southeast Asian Games silver medalists for Myanmar
Southeast Asian Games bronze medalists for Myanmar
Southeast Asian Games medalists in football
Footballers at the 2018 Asian Games
Competitors at the 2007 Southeast Asian Games
Asian Games competitors for Myanmar